Christie Murray (born 3 May 1990) is a Scottish footballer who plays as an attacking midfielder and captains Birmingham City in the FA WSL. She has also played for Arsenal, Bristol Academy, and Doncaster Rovers Belles of the FA WSL, as well as Celtic and Glasgow City of the Scottish Women's Premier League. Since making her debut in 2010, Murray has won over 70 caps for the Scotland national team.

Club career
While playing for the Scotland under-17s, Murray was scouted by Carson–Newman College. Aged 16, she moved to Jefferson City, Tennessee on a soccer scholarship and scored six goals for the Eagles. Murray started her club career with Queen's Park, before joining Celtic in 2007. On 13 May 2010, she scored twice in the Scottish Women's Premier League Cup final, as the team won their first trophy with a 4–1 victory over Spartans.

After four years with Celtic, Murray signed for Glasgow City on 23 January 2011. She helped the club reach the 2012 Champions League's round of 16. Two years later, Murray played in City's round of 16 defeat by Arsenal. She impressed the English club's Scottish manager Shelley Kerr who swooped to sign her in January 2014.

Murray left Arsenal after the 2014 season as her contract ended. In February 2015, she signed a contract with Bristol Academy, after impressing during a trial period with the club. When Bristol were relegated at the end of the 2015 season, Murray was one of several players to depart.

Murray re-signed with Celtic prior to the start of the 2016 Scottish Women's Premier League season and she made her debut in their historic first match at Celtic Park against Rangers on 13 April 2016, scoring the fifth goal in the 5–1 victory. During her second spell with the Glasgow side, she scored three goals as she helped them move into third place in the league table.

She returned to the FA WSL with Doncaster Rovers Belles in July 2016. On 24 July 2016, she made her debut in a 4–0 loss to Chelsea. In the 2016 season, she made 12 appearances in all competitions. She went on to make two appearances in the 2016–17 FA Women's Cup and finish the FA WSL Spring Series with 3 goals in 9 appearances. She scored 8 goals in 10 games in all competitions at the beginning of the 2017–18 season and was named FA WSL 2 Player of the Month in November 2017. In December 2017, she announced her departure from the club. During the winter break, she re-signed with Glasgow City.

On 14 July 2018, Murray joined Liverpool on a two-year contract and was given the number 10 shirt.

In the summer of 2020, Murray joined Birmingham City Women in the FA WSL, and was given the captains armband and the number 10 shirt.

International career
In 2009, she began attending the Scottish Football Association National Performance Centre at the University of Stirling.

After captaining the under-19 team, including at the 2008 UEFA Women's Under-19 Championship, she made her senior debut in a 3–0 loss to New Zealand at the Cyprus Cup on 1 March 2010. Her first goal for the senior side came on 5 April 2012, coming off the bench to score the winner in a 2–1 victory against the Republic of Ireland at Tynecastle Stadium in the 2013 UEFA Euro qualifiers.

Career statistics

International appearances

International goals
Scores and results list Scotland's goal tally first.

Honours

Club
Celtic
 Scottish Women's Premier League Cup: 2010
Glasgow City
 Scottish Women's Premier League: 2011, 2012, 2013
 Scottish Women's Premier League Cup: 2012, 2013
 Scottish Women's Cup: 2011, 2012, 2013

Individual
 FA WSL 2 Player of the Month: November 2017

References

External links

 
 
 
 Christie Murray at Glasgow City

1990 births
Living people
Scottish women's footballers
Scotland women's international footballers
Glasgow City F.C. players
Celtic F.C. Women players
Arsenal W.F.C. players
Bristol Academy W.F.C. players
Women's Super League players
Footballers from Bellshill
Doncaster Rovers Belles L.F.C. players
Liverpool F.C. Women players
Carson–Newman University alumni
Women's association football midfielders
Women's association football forwards
2019 FIFA Women's World Cup players
Scottish expatriate women's footballers
Scottish expatriate sportspeople in the United States
Expatriate women's soccer players in the United States
UEFA Women's Euro 2017 players